Mischer may refer to:
 Misher dialect, a variety of Tatar
 Misher Tatars, an ethnic group of Russia
 Kevin Misher, American producer

See also 
 Meshchera, a historic group of Volga Finns
 Mischer (disambiguation)